40 Bands 80 Minutes! is a 2006 American rockumentary about the Los Angeles underground music scene in 2006 directed by Sean Carnage.

In the style of Urgh! A Music War, 40 Bands 80 Minutes! is a series of punk and experimental musical performances and performance art pieces, with minimal narration. The film was conceived as a way to systematically document the music of the entire L.A. underground music scene.

On March 6, 2020, 40 Bands 80 Minutes! was reissued with remastered sound and picture.

Development
All of the performances in 40 Bands 80 Minutes! were filmed on March 6, 2006, at all-ages performance space Il Corral in Hollywood, CA.

The young performers were required to play for less than two minutes, with no re-takes.  The results were captured with four digital video cameras and a professional sound crew.  Over 52 new bands were filmed.  Forty performances are contained in the 40 Bands 80 Minutes! feature documentary.  The other twelve performances are available as extras on the 40 Bands 80 Minutes! DVD which was released in late 2006 by the Long Beach, CA-based label, Sounds Are Active Films.

Among the most prominent groups are established L.A. underground bands Abe Vigoda, Anavan, Bizzart, Captain Ahab, Explogasm, Fireworks, Halloween Swim Team, Harassor, Three ( \\\ ), Health, I Heart Lung, and Toxic Loincloth.  There are also solo and duo performances by members of acclaimed bands Mika Miko, Friends Forever and Child Pornography.  The last performance by legendary Los Angeles band Wives is also included.

Director Sean Carnage, the movie's crew and featured performer Rob Williams (who is listed in the Guinness Book of World Records as the fastest man in the world to make a sandwich with his feet) were producers at Q Television Network, a gay and lesbian cable network which entered bankruptcy the day 40 Bands 80 Minutes! was shot.

On March 6, 2020, 40 Bands 80 Minutes! was reissued with remastered sound and picture.

Musical performances

References

External links
The Official 40 Bands 80 Minutes! webpage
 

2006 films
2006 documentary films
Documentary films about punk music and musicians
2000s English-language films